Luca Carboni (born 12 October 1962) is an Italian singer-songwriter. He debuted in 1981 as guitarist in the band Teobaldi Rock, publishing his first solo album in 1983.  He is also a painter and carpenter.

Biography

Carboni was born in Bologna.

In 1976, at 14, he founded the band Teobaldi Rock, with the role of guitarist and songwriter. In 1980 the band took part in the Bologna Rock 80 festival; the following year they released the first and last single, "L.N."/"Odore d'inverno".

Carboni's road changed when the Stadio read his lyrics and asked him a song for their first album. The song was entitled "Navigando controvento" and appeared in the album Stadio (1982). The band's leader, Gaetano Curreri, helped him in realizing his first album, published in January 1984 and entitled ...intanto Dustin Hoffman non-sbaglia un film: it was co-produced by Curreri and included collaborations with Ron and Lucio Dalla. The album sold 30,000 copies and the single "Ci stiamo sbagliando" more than 50,000, establishing Carboni in the Italian music panorama. In that year he won the Festivalbar for the category Youngs.

In 1985 he released Forever, which sold 70,000 copies and entered the Italian Top Ten for some weeks. After a pause which he devoted to inner analysis and painting, in 1987 he released the album Luca Carboni, which contains one of his most popular songs, "Silvia lo sai", a story of adolescence and drug. This song and the other hit "Farfallina" led the album to sell up to 700,000 copies, reaching the top of the Italian charts. The same album was re-issued in Spanish in 1989 and was followed by two tours.

The less pop-oriented and more impervious  Persone silenziose  (1989) sold 500,000 copies, and included the song "Primavera". Carboni's most successful album was Carboni, released in January 1992, containing the pop hits "Ci vuole un fisico bestiale", "La mia città" and "Mare mare", which won the Festivalbar in the following summer. Carboni sold more than a million copies and was followed, as common for Carboni, by a summer tour, although this time on a European scale; he also sang in eight concerts with Jovanotti.

In the 1990s Carboni moved to a more personal and minimalistic inspiration, as showed by the voluntarily raw-produced MONDO world welt monde (1995) and by Carovana (1998), which he mostly realized alone at home. He spent the following two years in tours, including some stages abroad.

His latest albums are  Il tempo dell'amore (1999, a collection with two new songs), LU*CA (2001) and ...le band si sciolgono (2006), which includes collaborations with Gaetano Curreri, Pino Daniele and Tiziano Ferro. In January 2009 he released Musiche ribelli, a collection of covers of 1970s and 1980s Italian singer-songwriters such as Eugenio Finardi, Enzo Jannacci, Francesco De Gregori, Edoardo Bennato and Pierangelo Bertoli.

In an interview in 2011 he described himself as a practising Catholic. He regularly attends the Mass.

On 1 October 2013, to celebrate 30-year career was released the new compilation album "Fisico & Politico" containing 3 unreleased tracks and 9 great successes already engraved by the artist previously, replicated in duet with Tiziano Ferro, Elisa, Chris Brown, Alice, Miguel Bosé, Franco Battiato, Biagio Antonacci, Cesare Cremonini and Samuele Bersani. The new and first single from the album "Fisico e Politico" is played in duet with Fabri Fibra. The others are unpublished songs. "There is always a song" written by Luciano Ligabue and dimentica (Forget).

On 7 February 2020, Marco Masini's album Masini +1 30th Anniversary was released, containing the song Vaffanculo in duet with Luca Carboni. On 3 April, the single Canzone sbagliata by rapper Danti featuring a duet with Shade and Luca Carboni is released. On 8 May 2020, the single Ma il cielo è sempre più blu (Italian Stars 4 Life, a cover of Rino Gaetano's 1975 song Ma il cielo è sempre più blu, was released as a digital download, featuring Luca Carboni in a choral collaboration (recorded remotely) with fifty-four of the most popular Italian singers and musicians. The song was made to support the Italian Red Cross during the COVID-19 emergency. On 10 July 2020, La canzone dell'estate, written by him during the quarantine, was released.

Discography
Studio albums
1984 – ...intanto Dustin Hoffman non sbaglia un film
1985 – Forever
1987 – Luca Carboni
1989 – Persone silenziose
1992 – Carboni 
1995 – Mondo
1998 – Carovana
2001 – Luca
2006 – ...le band si sciolgono
2009 - Musiche ribelli
2011 – Senza titolo
2015 – Pop-up
2018 – Sputnik
 Greatest hits albums
1993 - Diario Carboni
1999 - Il tempo dell'amore
2007 - .....una rosa per te!
2013 - Fisico & politico
Live albums
2003 - Live

References

1962 births
Living people
Musicians from Bologna
Italian male singer-songwriters
Italian musicians
Italian Roman Catholics